Marxist humanism is an international body of thought and political action rooted in a humanist interpretation of the works of Karl Marx. It is an investigation into "what human nature consists of and what sort of society would be most conducive to human thriving" from a critical perspective rooted in Marxist philosophy. Marxist humanists argue that Marx himself was concerned with investigating similar questions.

Marxist humanism was born in 1932 with the publication of Marx's Economic and Philosophic Manuscripts of 1844 and reached a degree of prominence in the 1950s and 1960s. Marxist humanists contend that there is continuity between the early philosophical writings of Marx, in which he develops his theory of alienation, and the structural description of capitalist society found in his later works such as Capital. They hold that it is necessary to grasp Marx's philosophical foundations to understand his later works properly.

Contrary to the official dialectical materialism of the Soviet Union and to interpretations of Marx rooted in the structural Marxism of Louis Althusser, Marxist humanists argue that Marx's work was an extension or transcendence of enlightenment humanism. Where other Marxist philosophies see Marxism as a natural science, Marxist humanism reaffirms the doctrine of "man is the measure of all things" – that humans are essentially different to the rest of the natural order and should be treated so by Marxist theory.

Origins
The beginnings of Marxist humanism lie with the publication of György Lukács's History and Class Consciousness and Karl Korsch's Marxism and Philosophy in 1923. In these books, Lukács and Korsch proffer a Marxism that emphasizes the Hegelian element of Karl Marx's thought. Marxism is not simply a theory of political economy that improves on its predecessors, nor a scientific sociology, akin to the natural sciences. Marxism is primarily a critique – a self-conscious transformation of society.

Korsch's book underscores Marx's doctrine of the unity of theory and practice, viewing socialist revolution as the "realization of philosophy". Marxism does not make philosophy obsolete, as "vulgar" Marxism believes; instead Marxism preserves the truths of philosophy until their revolutionary transformation into reality. 

The salient essay in Lukács's collection introduces the concept of "reification". In capitalist societies, human properties, relations and actions are transformed into properties, relations and actions of Man-produced things, which become independent of Man and govern his life. These Man-created things are then imagined to be originally independent of Man. Conversely, human beings are transformed into thing-like beings that do not behave in a human way but according to the laws of the thing-world. Lukács argues that elements of this concept are implicit in the analysis of commodity fetishism found in Marx's magnum opus Capital. Bourgeois society loses sight of the role of human action in the creation of social meaning. It thinks value is immanent in things and regards persons as commodities.

The writings of Antonio Gramsci are also extremely influential on the development of a humanist understanding of Marxism. Insisting on Marx's debt to Hegel, Gramsci sees Marxism as a "philosophy of praxis" and an "absolute historicism" that transcends traditional materialism and traditional idealism.

The first publication of Marx's Economic and Philosophic Manuscripts in 1932 greatly changed the reception of his work. This early work of Marx was  written in 1844, when Marx was twenty-five or twenty-six years old. The Manuscripts situated Marx's reading of political economy, his relationship to the philosophies of Georg Wilhelm Friedrich Hegel and Ludwig Feuerbach, and his views on communism, within a new theoretical framework. In the Manuscripts, Marx borrows philosophical terminology from Hegel and Feuerbach to posit a critique of capitalist society based in "alienation". Through his own activity, Man becomes alien from his human possibilities: to the products of his own activity, to the nature in which he lives, to other human beings and to himself. The concept is not merely descriptive, it is a call for de-alienation through radical change of the world. 

On publication, the significance of the 1844 Manuscripts was recognized by Marxists such as Raya Dunayevskaya, Herbert Marcuse and Henri Lefebvre. In the period after the Second World War, the texts were translated into Italian and discussed by Galvano Della Volpe. The philosophers Maurice Merleau-Ponty and Jean-Paul Sartre were also drawn to Marxism by the Manuscripts at this time. In 1961, a volume containing an introduction by Erich Fromm was published in the US.

As they provided a missing link between the Hegelian philosophical humanism of Marx's early writings and the economics of the later Marx, Marx's Grundrisse were also an important source for Marxist humanism. This 1,000-page collection of Marx's working notes for Capital was first published in Moscow in 1939 and became available in an accessible edition in 1953. Several analysts (most notably Roman Rozdolsky) have commented that the Grundrisse shows the role played by the early Marx's concerns with alienation and the Hegelian concept of dialectic in the formation of his magnum opus.

Currents

In the aftermath of the occupation of France and the Second World War, the independent leftist journal Les Temps modernes was founded in 1946. Among its original editorial board were the existentialist philosophers Jean-Paul Sartre and Maurice Merleau-Ponty. While both lent support to the politics and tactics of the French Communist Party and the Soviet Union during this period, they concurrently attempted to formulate a phenomenological and existential Marxism that opposed the Stalinist version. In their view, the failure of the Western Communist Parties to lead successful revolutions and the development of an authoritarian state structure in the Soviet Union were both connected to the "naturalism" and "scientism" of the official orthodox Marxist theory. Orthodox Marxism is not a theory of revolutionary self-emancipation but a self-proclaimed science that imposes a direction upon history from above in the name of irrefutable "iron laws". Against this, Sartre and Merleau-Ponty argued for a subject-centered view of history that emphasized the lived experience of historical actors as the source of cognition.

In 1939, Henri Lefebvre, then a member of the French Communist Party, published Dialectical Materialism. This book, written in 1934–5, advanced a reconstruction of Marx's oeuvre in the light of the 1844 Manuscripts. Lefebvre argued here that Marx's dialectic was not a "Dialectics of Nature" (as set forth by Friedrich Engels) but was instead based on concepts of alienation and praxis. In the wake of the Soviet suppression of the Hungarian Uprising of 1956, Lefebvre – together with Kostas Axelos, Jean Duvignaud, Pierre Fougeyrollas and Edgar Morin – founded the journal Arguments. This publication became the center of a Marxist humanist critique of Stalinism. In his theory of alienation, Lefebvre drew not only from the Manuscripts, but also from Sartre, to present a critique that encompassed the styles of consumption, culture, systems of meaning and language under capitalism.

Starting in the late 1950s, Roger Garaudy, for many years the chief philosophical spokesman of the French Communist Party, offered a humanistic interpretation of Marx stemming from Marx's early writings that called for dialogue between Communists and existentialists, phenomenologists and Christians.

The period following the death of Joseph Stalin in 1953 saw a number of movements for liberalization in Eastern Europe. Following Nikita Khrushchev's secret speech, where he denounced Stalinism, Marx's 1844 Manuscripts were used as the basis for a new "socialist humanism" in countries such as Hungary, Poland and Czechoslovakia. The Petofi Circle, which included some of György Lukács's disciples, was a center of what was termed "revisionism" in Hungary. In 1959, the Polish writer Leszek Kołakowski published an article "Karl Marx and the Classical Definition of Truth" that drew a sharp distinction between the theory of knowledge found in the works of the young Marx and the theory found in Engels and Lenin. This challenge was taken up by Adam Schaff, a member of the Central Committee of the Polish United Workers' Party, and expanded into an investigation into the persistence of alienation in socialist societies. The Czechoslovak Karel Kosik also began the critique of communist dogmatism that would develop into his Dialectics of the Concrete, and would eventually land him in jail.

 
This period also saw the formation of a humanist Marxism by Yugoslav philosophers Mihailo Marković and Gajo Petrović that would come to act as the basis of the Praxis School. From 1964 to 1975, this group published a philosophical journal, Praxis, and organized annual philosophical debates on the island of Korčula. They concentrated on themes such as alienation, reification and bureaucracy.

In Britain, the New Left Review was founded from an amalgamation of two earlier journals, The New Reasoner and the Universities and Left Review, in 1959. Its original editorial team – E. P. Thompson, John Saville and Stuart Hall – were committed to a socialist humanist perspective until their replacement by Perry Anderson in 1962.

Philosophy

Marxist humanism opposes the philosophy of "dialectical materialism" that was orthodox among the Soviet-aligned Communist Parties. Following the synthesis of Hegel's dialectics and philosophical materialism in Friedrich Engels's Anti-Dühring, the Soviets saw Marxism as a theory not just of society but of reality as a whole. Engels's book is a work of what he calls "natural philosophy", and not one of science. Nonetheless, he claims that discoveries within the sciences tend to confirm the scientific nature of his theory. This world-view is instantiated within both the natural and social sciences.

Marxist humanists reject an understanding of society based on natural science, asserting the centrality and distinctiveness of people and society. Marxist humanism views Marxist theory as not primarily scientific but philosophical. Social science is not another natural science and people and society are not instantiations of universal natural processes. Rather, people are subjects – centers of consciousness and values – and science is an embedded part of the totalizing perspective of humanist philosophy. Echoing the inheritance of Marx's thought from German Idealism, Marxist humanism holds that reality does not exist independently of human knowledge, but is partly constituted by it. Because human social practice has a purposive, transformative character, it requires a mode of understanding different from the detached, empirical observation of the natural sciences. A theoretical understanding of society should instead be based in empathy with or participation in the social activities it investigates.

Alienation

In line with this, Marxist humanism treats alienation as Marxism's central concept. In his early writings, the young Marx advances a critique of modern society on the grounds that it impedes human flourishing. Marx's theory of alienation suggests a dysfunctional or hostile relation between entities that naturally belong in harmony with one another – an artificial separation of one
entity from another with which it had been previously and properly conjoined. The concept has "subjective" and "objective" variants. Alienation is "subjective" when human individuals feel "estranged" or do not feel at home in the modern social world. Individuals are objectively alienated when they do not develop their essential human capacities. For Marx, objective alienation is the cause of subjective alienation: individuals experience their lives as lacking meaning or fulfilment because society does not promote the deployment of their human capacities.

Marxist humanism views alienation as the guiding idea of both Marx's early writings and his later works. According to this school of thought, the central concepts of Capital cannot be fully and properly understood without reference to this seminal theme. Communism is not merely a new socioeconomic formation that will supersede the present one, but the re-appropriation of Man's life and the abolition of alienation.

In the state

The earliest appearance of this concept in Marx's corpus is the Critique of Hegel's Philosophy of Right from 1843. Drawing a contrast between the forms of community in the ancient and medieval worlds and the individualism of modern civil society, Marx here characterizes the modern social world as "atomistic". Modern civil society does not sustain the individual as a member of a community. Where in medieval society people are motivated by the interest of their estate, an unimpeded individualism is the principle that underpins modern social life. Marx's critique does not rest with civil society: he also holds that the modern political state is distinguished by its "abstract" character. While the state acknowledges the communal dimension of human flourishing, its existence has a "transcendental remoteness" separate from the "real life" of civil society. The state resolves the alienation of the modern world, but in an inadequate manner.

Marx credits Hegel with significant insight into both the basic structure of the modern social world and its disfigurement by alienation. Hegel believes alienation will no longer exist when the social world objectively facilitates the self-realization of individuals, and individuals subjectively understand that this is so. For Hegel, objective alienation is already non-existent, as the modern social world does facilitate individuals' self-realization. However, individuals still find themselves in a state of subjective alienation. Hegel wishes not to reform or change the institutions of the modern social world, but to change the way in which society is understood by its members. Marx shares Hegel's belief that subjective alienation is widespread but denies that the rational or modern state enables individuals to actualize themselves. Marx instead takes subjective alienation to indicate that objective alienation has not been overcome.

In Bauer

The most well-known metaphor in Marx's Critique – that of religion as the opium of the people – is derived from the writings of the theologian Bruno Bauer. Bauer's primary concern is religious alienation. Bauer views religion as a division in Man's consciousness. Man suffers from the illusion that religion exists apart from and independent of his own consciousness, and that he himself is dependent on his own creation. Religious beliefs become opposed to consciousness as a separate power. A religious consciousness cannot exist without this breaking up or tearing apart of consciousness: religion deprives Man of his own attributes and places them in a heavenly world. Self-consciousness makes itself into an object, a thing, loses control of itself, and feels itself to be nothing before an opposing power.

Since religious belief is the work of a divided mind, it stands in contradiction to itself: the Gospels contradict each other and the world; they contain dogmas so far removed from common sense that they can be understood only as mysteries. The God that men worship is a subhuman God – their own imaginary, inflated and distorted reflection. The Gospel narrative contains no historical truth – it is an expression of a transient stage in the historical development of self-consciousness. Christianity was of service to self-consciousness in awakening a consciousness of values that belong to every human individual, but it also created a new servitude. The task of the present phase of human history is to liberate Man's spirit from the bonds of Christian mythology, free the state from religion, and thereby restore to Man his alienated essence.

In the Critique, Marx adopts Bauer's criticism of religion and applies this method to other fields. Marx sees Man's various alienations as peels around a genuine center. Religion is at once both the symptom of a deep social malaise and a protest against it. The criticism of religion leads to the criticism of other alienations, which must be dealt with in the same way. The influence of Bauer follows Marx through all his later criticism: this is visible in the many places where Marx establishes an economic point by reference to a religious analogy.

In Hegel

In the Economic and Philosophic Manuscripts of 1844, Marx further develops his critique of Hegel. Marx here praises Hegel's dialectic for its view of labor as an alienating process: alienation is an historical stage that must be passed through for the development and deployment of essential human powers. It is an essential characteristic of finite mind (Man) to produce things, to express itself in objects, to objectify itself in physical things, social institutions and cultural products. Every objectification is of necessity an instance of alienation: the produced objects become alien to the producer.  Humanity creates itself by externalizing its own essence, developing through a process of alienation alternating with transcendence of that alienation. 
Man externalizes his essential powers in an objectified state, and then assimilates them back into him from outside.

For Hegel, alienation is the state of consciousness as it acquaints itself with the external, objective, phenomenal world. Hegel believes that reality is Spirit realizing itself. Spirit's existence is constituted only in and through its own productive activity. In the process of realizing itself, Spirit produces a world that it initially believes to be external, but gradually comes to understand is its own production. 

All that exists is the Absolute Spirit (Absolute Mind, Absolute Idea or God). The Absolute is not a static or timeless entity but a dynamic Self, engaged in a cycle of alienation and de-alienation. Spirit becomes alienated from itself in nature and returns from its self-alienation through the finite Mind, Man. Human history is a process of de-alienation, consisting in the constant growth of Man's knowledge of the Absolute. Conversely, human history is also the development of the Absolute's knowledge of itself: the Absolute becomes self-aware through Man. Man is a natural being and is thus a self-alienated Spirit. But Man is also an historical being, who can achieve adequate knowledge of the Absolute, and is thus capable of becoming a de-alienated being.

Marx criticizes Hegel for understanding labor as "abstract mental labour". Hegel equates Man with self-consciousness and sees alienation as constituted by objectivity. Consciousness emancipates itself from alienation by overcoming objectivity, recognizing that what appears as an external object is a projection of consciousness itself. Hegel understands that the objects which appear to order men's lives — their religion, their wealth — in fact belong to Man and are the product of essential human capacities. Freedom consists in men's becoming fully self-conscious and understanding that their environment and culture are emanations from Spirit. Marx rejects the notion of Spirit, believing that Man's ideas, though important, are by themselves insufficient to explain social and cultural change. In Hegel, Man's integration with nature takes places on a spiritual level and is thus, in Marx's view, an abstraction and an illusion.

In Feuerbach

The main influence on Marx's thinking in this regard is Ludwig Feuerbach, who in his Essence of Christianity aims to overcome the separation of individuals from their essential human nature. Feuerbach believes modern individuals are alienated by their holding false beliefs about God. People misidentify as an objective being what in actuality is a man-made projection of their own essential predicates.

For Feuerbach, Man is not a self-alienated God; God is self-alienated Man. God is Man's essence abstracted, absolutized and estranged from Man. Man creates the idea of God by gathering the best features of his human nature – his goodness, knowledge and power – glorifying them, and projecting them into a beyond. Man is alienated from himself not because he refuses to recognize nature as a self-alienated form of God, but because he creates, and puts above himself, an imagined alien higher being and bows before him as a slave. Christian belief entails the sacrifice, the practical denial or repression, of essential human characteristics. Liberation will come when people recognize what God really is and, through a community that subjects human essence to no alien limitation, reclaim the goodness, knowledge and power they have projected heavenward.

This critique extends beyond religion, as Feuerbach argues in his Theses on the Reform of Philosophy that Hegelian philosophy is itself alienated. Hegel regards alienation as affecting thought or consciousness and not humanity in its material being. For Hegel, concrete, finite existence is merely a reflection of a system of thought or consciousness. Hegel starts and ends with the infinite. The finite, Man, is present as only a phase in the evolution of a human spirit, the Absolute. In opposition to this, Feuerbach argues that Man is alienated because he mediates a direct relationship of sensuous intuition to concrete reality through religion and philosophy. By recognizing that his relationship to nature is instead one of immediate unity, Man can attain a "positive humanism" that is more than just a denial of religion.

In work

Following Feuerbach, Marx places the earthly reality of Man in the center of this picture. Where Hegel sees labor as spiritual activity, Marx sees labor as physical interchange with nature: in nature, Man creates himself and creates nature. Where Hegel identifies human essence with self-consciousness, Marx articulates a concept of species-being (Gattungswesen), according to which Man's essential nature is that of a free producer, freely reproducing his own conditions of life.

Man's nature is to be his own creator, to form and develop himself by working on and transforming the world outside him in cooperation with his fellow men. Man should be in control of this process but in modern conditions Man has lost control of his own evolution. Where land-ownership is subject to the laws of a market economy, human individuals do not fulfill themselves through productive activity. A worker's labor, his personal qualities of muscle and brain, his abilities and aspirations, his sensuous life-activity, appear to him as things, commodities to be bought and sold like any other. Much as Bauer and Feuerbach see religion as an alienating invention of the human mind, so does Marx believe the modern productive process to reduce the human being to the status of a commodity. In religion, God holds the initiative and Man is in a state of dependence. In economics, money moves humans around as though they were objects instead of the reverse.

Marx claims that human individuals are alienated in four ways:
 From their products 
 From their productive activity
 From other individuals
 From their own nature.

Firstly, the product of a worker's labor confronts him "as an alien object that has power over him". A worker has bestowed life on an object that now confronts him as hostile and alien. The worker creates an object, which appears to be his property. However, he now becomes its property. When he externalizes his life in an object, a worker's life belongs to the object and not to himself; his nature becomes the attribute of another person or thing. Where in earlier historical epochs, one person ruled over another, now the thing rules over the person, the product over the producer.
 
Secondly, the worker relates to the process by which this product is created as something alien that does not belong to him. His work typically does not fulfill his natural talents and spiritual goals and is experienced instead as "emasculation".

Thirdly, the worker experiences mutual estrangement – alienation from other individuals. Each individual regards others as a means to his own end. Concern for others exists mainly in the form of a calculation about the effect those others have on his own narrow self-interest.

Fourthly, the worker experiences self-estrangement: alienation from his human nature. Because work is a means to survival only, the worker does not fulfill his human need for self-realization in productive activity. The worker is only at ease in his animal functions of eating, drinking and procreating. In his distinctly human functions, he is made to feel like an animal. Modern labor turns the worker's essence as a producer into something "alien".

Marx mentions other features of alienated labor: overwork, or the amount of time that the modern worker has to spend engaged in productive activity; "more and more one-sided" development of the worker, or the lack of variety in his activity; the machine-like character of labor and the intellectual stunting that results from the neglect of mental skills in productive activity.

The capitalist does not escape the process of alienation. Where the worker is reduced to an animal condition, the capitalist is reduced to an abstract money-power. His human qualities are transformed into a personification of the power of money.

In contrast to this negative account of alienated labor, Marx's Notes on James Mill offer a positive description of unalienated labor. Marx here claims that in self-realizing work, a worker's personality is made objective in his product and he enjoys contemplating that feature in the object he produces. As he has expressed his talents and abilities in the productive process, the activity is authentic to his character. It ceases to be an activity he loathes. Marx further claims that the producer gains immediate satisfaction from the use and enjoyment of his product – the satisfaction arising from the knowledge of having produced an object that corresponds to the needs of another human being. In an unalienated society, a worker can be said to have created an object that corresponds to the needs of another's essential nature. His productive activity is a mediator between the needs of another person and the entire species. Marx suggests that this confirms the "communal" character of human nature, because individuals play this essential role in the affirmation of each other's nature.

To overcome alienation and allow humankind to realize its species-being, it is not enough, as Hegel and Feuerbach believe, to simply grasp alienation. It is necessary to transform the world that engenders alienation: the wage-labor system must be transcended, and the separation of the laborer from the means of labor abolished. This is not the task of a solitary philosophical critic, but of class struggle. The historic victory of capitalism in the middle of the 19th century has made alienation universal, since everything enters in to the cycle of exchange, and all value is reduced to commodity value. In a developed capitalist society, all forms of alienation are comprised in the worker's relation to production. All possibilities of the worker's very being are linked to the class struggle against capital. The proletariat, which owns nothing buts its labor power, occupies a position radically different to all other classes. The liberation of the working class will therefore be the liberation of mankind.

This emancipation is not simply the abolition of private property. Marx differentiates his communism from the crude communism that seeks to abolish everything that cannot be the property of all. For Marx, this would be the generalization of alienation and the abolition of talent and individuality – tantamount to abolishing civilization. Marx instead sees communism as a positive abolition of private property, where Man recovers his own species-being, and Man's activity is no longer opposed to him as something alien. This is a direct affirmation of humanity: just as atheism ceases to be significant when the affirmation of Man is no longer dependent on the negation of God, communism is a direct affirmation of Man independent of the negation of private property.

In division of labor

In the German Ideology, Marx and his collaborator Friedrich Engels provide an account of alienation as deriving from division of labor. Alienation is said to arise from improvements in tools, which in turn lead to commerce. Man transforms objects produced by Man into commodities – vehicles for abstract exchange-value. Division of labor and exchange relations subsume individuals in classes, subordinating them to forces to which they have no choice but to comply. Alienated processes appear to individuals as if they were natural processes. Physical and mental work are also separated from each other, giving rise to self-deluded ideologists who believe their thoughts have an inherent validity and are not dictated by social needs.

Marx and Engels here attack Feuerbach for advancing an "essentialist" account of human nature that reduces real historical men to a philosophical category. They argue that it is not a philosophical concept ("Man") that makes history, but real individuals in definite historical conditions.

In economics

In the Grundrisse, Marx continues his discussion of the problem of alienation in the context of political economy. Here, the central  themes of the 1844 Manuscripts are dealt with in a much more sophisticated manner. Marx builds on his earlier conception of Man as a productive, object-creating being. The concepts found in Marx's earlier work – alienation, objectification, appropriation, Man's dialectical relationship to nature and his generic or social nature – all recur in the Grundrisse.

Marx views political economy as a reflection of the alienated consciousness of bourgeois society. It mystifies human reality by transforming the production of commodities into "objective" laws which independently regulate human activity. The human subject is made into the object of his own products. A key difference between the Grundrisse and the Manuscripts is Marx's starting with an analysis of production, rather than the mechanisms of exchange. The production of objects must be emancipated from the alienated form given to it by bourgeois society. Moreover, Marx no longer says that what a worker sells is his labor, but rather his labor-power.

The discussion of alienation in the Grundrisse is also more firmly rooted in history. Marx argues that alienation did not exist in earlier periods – primitive communism – where wealth was still conceived as residing in natural objects and not man-made commodities. However, such societies lacked the creation of objects by purposive human activity. They cannot be a model for a fully-developed communism that realizes human potentiality. Capital is an alienating force, but it has fulfilled a very positive function. It has developed the productive forces enormously, has replaced natural needs by ones historically created and has given birth to a world market. Nonetheless, Marx sees capitalism as transitory: free competition will inevitably hinder the development of capitalism.

The key to understanding the ambivalent nature of capitalism is the notion of time. On the one hand, the profits of capitalism are
built on the creation of surplus work-time, but on the other the wealth of capitalism has emancipated Man from manual labor and provided
him increasing access to free time. Marx criticizes political economy for its division of Man's time between work and leisure. This argument misunderstands the nature of human activity. Labor is not naturally coercive. Rather, the historical conditions in which labor is performed frustrate human spontaneity. Work should not be a mere means for Man's existence, it should become the very contents of his life.

In property
The Grundrisse also continues the discussion of private property that Marx began in the German Ideology. Marx's views on property stand in contrast to those of Hegel, who believes that property realizes human personality through objectification in the external world. For Marx, property is not the realization of personality but its negation. The possession of property by one person necessarily entails its non-possession by another. Property is thus not to be assured to all, but to be abolished.

The first form of property, according to Marx, is tribal property. Tribal property originates in the capacity of a human group to gain possession of land. Tribal property precedes the existence of permanent settlement and agriculture. The act of possession is made possible by the prior existence of group cohesion, i.e. a social, tribal organization. Thus, property does not pre-date society but results from it. An individual's relation to property is mediated through membership of the group. It is a form of unalienated property that realizes Man's positive relationship to his fellow tribesmen. However, this relationship limits the individual's power to establish a self-interest distinct from the general interest of society. This primitive type of common ownership disappears with the development of agriculture.

The unity of the individual and society is preserved by more complex societies in two distinct forms: oriental despotism and the classical polis. In oriental despotism, the despot personifies society – all property belongs to him. In the polis, the basic form of property is public. Economic activity depends on community-oriented considerations. Political rights depend on participation in common ownership of land. Agriculture is considered morally and publicly superior to commerce. Public agricultural policy is judged  on its ability to produce more patriotic citizens, rather than economic considerations. Alienation between the public and private sphere does not exist in the polis.

Marx does not idealize the polis or call for its restoration. Its foundation on naturalistic matter is specific and limited. Marx opposes to this the universality of capital. Capital is objectified human labor: on the one hand it indicates hidden human potentialities but on the other its appearance is accompanied by alienation. Capitalism develops a kind of property free from social limitations and considerations. Concurrently, capitalism ends individual private property as traditionally conceived, in that it divorces the producer from the ownership of the means of production. Such property is at the exclusive disposition of its owner. Yet, the development of capitalist society also entails more complex production, requiring combined efforts that cannot be satisfied by individual property.

In commodity fetishism

To make a fetish of something, or fetishize it, is to invest it with powers it does not in itself have. In Capital. Volume 1, Marx argues that the false consciousness of human beings in relation to their social existence arises from the way production is organized in commodity society. He calls this illusion "commodity fetishism".

The production of a product as a value is a phenomenon specific to market economies. Whereas in other economies, products have only use-value, in market economies products have both use-value and exchange-value. Labor that produces use-value is concrete, or qualitatively differentiated: tailoring, weaving, mining, etc. Labor productive of exchange-value is abstract, just a featureless proportion of the total labor of society.

In market economies, the labor of persons takes the form of the exchange-value of things. The time taken to produce a commodity takes the form of the exchange-value of the commodity. The measure that originally relates to the life process itself is thus introduced into the products of labor. The mutual relations of humans as exchangers of goods take on the form of relations between objects. These objects appear to have mysterious qualities which of themselves make them valuable, as though value were a natural, physical property of things. While commodities do indeed have exchange-value, they do not have this value autonomously, but as a result of the way labor is organized. In this situation, social relations masquerade as things or relations between things. By failing to understand this process, humans involuntarily accept that their own qualities, abilities and efforts do not belong to themselves but are inherent in the objects they create.

The value of commodities is constituted by the labor bestowed upon them. However, commodities appear to have value in and of themselves. This appearance arises from the particular social form within which commodity production takes place – the market society. Here, the social character of production is expressed not in production itself but only in exchange. In other societies – primitive communism, the patriarchal tribe, feudalism, the future communist society – producers are directly integrated with one another by custom, directive, or plan. In commodity society, producers connect mediately, not as producers but as marketeers. Producers' products do not have a social form prior to their manifestations as commodities, and it is the commodity form alone that connects producers. The relations between commodities are immediately social, but the relations between producers are only indirectly so. Persons lack direct social relations, thus it appears to them that they labor because their products have value. However, their products in fact have value because labor has been bestowed on them. Men relate to each other through the value they create. This value regulates their lives as producers, yet they do not recognize their own authorship of this value.

Marx does not use the term alienation here, but the description is the same as in his earlier works, as is the analogy with religion that he owes to Feuerbach. In religious fetishism an activity of thought, a cultural process, vests an object with apparent power. The object does not really acquire the power mentally referred to it. However, if a culture makes a fetish of an object, its members come to perceive it as endowed with this power. Commodity fetishism is the inability of human beings to see their products for what they are. Rather than wielding his human power, Man becomes enslaved by his own works: political institutions appear to have autonomy, turning them into instruments of oppression; scientific development and the organization of labor, improved administration and multiplication of useful products are transformed into quasi-natural forces and turned against Man.

A particular expression of commodity fetishism is the reification of labor power, in which human persons appear in the context of labor as commodities bought and sold on the market according to the laws of value. Wage-labor, wherein a class of wage-earners sells its labor power to an owner of the means of production, is the characteristic feature of capitalism. Capitalist profit finds its origin in there being a commodity whose use-value is a source of value, but which creates exchange-value when its use-value is consumed. This commodity is labor power. Like any other commodity, the value of labor power is determined by the amount of labor time necessary to reproduce it. Labor power is reproduced through maintaining the worker in a condition in which he is able to work and to rear a fresh generation of workers. The value of labor power is thus the value of the products necessary to keep the laborer and his children alive and able-bodied. This is determined not by the mere physiological minimum but also by needs that vary historically.

The use-value of labor power consists in the fact that it creates an exchange-value greater than its own. A capitalist pays for the right to use a worker's labor power over the course of a day, yet the working day is much longer than necessary to keep a worker in an active state. If the wages earned over the first half of the worker's day correspond to the value necessary to reproduce his labor power, those earned over the second half amount to unrequited labor. This generates an excess of value much larger than the cost of the worker's maintenance. This is what Marx calls "surplus value". The commodity character of labor power is the social nexus on which capitalist production is built. In this situation, a man functions as a thing. He is reduced to a state where it is his exchange-value, and not his personality, that counts for anything.

Praxis
Marx's theory of alienation is intimately linked to a theory of praxis. Praxis is Man's conscious, autonomous, creative, self-reflective shaping of changing historical conditions. Marx understands praxis as both a tool for changing the course of history and a criterion for the evaluation of history. Marxist humanism views Man as in essence a being of praxis – a self-conscious creature who can appropriate for his own use the whole realm of inorganic nature – and Marx's philosophy as in essence a "philosophy of praxis" – a theory that demands the act of changing the world while also participating in this act.

As human nature
The concept of human nature is the belief that all human individuals share some common features. In the Economic and Philosophic Manuscripts of 1844, Marx describes his position on human nature as a unity of naturalism and humanism.

Naturalism is the view that Man is part of the system of nature. Marx sees Man as an objective, natural being – the product of a long biological evolution. Nature is that which is opposed to Man, yet  Man is himself a part of the system of nature. It is through nature that Man satisfies the needs and drives that constitute his essence. Man needs objects that are independent of him to express his objective nature.

Humanism is the view that Man is a being of praxis who both changes nature and creates himself. It is not the simple attribute of consciousness that makes Man peculiarly human, but rather the unity of consciousness and practice – the conscious objectification of human powers and needs in sensuous reality. Marx distinguishes the free, conscious productive activity of human beings from the unconscious, compulsive production of animals. Praxis is an activity unique to Man: while other animals produce, they produce only what is immediately necessary. Man, on the other hand, produces universally and freely. Man is able to produce according to the standard of any species and at all times knows how to apply an intrinsic standard to the object he produces. Man thus creates according to the laws of beauty.  The starting point for Man's self-development is the wealth of his own capacities and needs that he himself creates. Man's evolution enters the stage of human history when, through praxis, he acquires more and more control of blind natural forces and produces a humanized natural environment.

As human knowledge
Since Man's basic characteristic is his labor – his commerce with nature in which he is both active and passive – the traditional problems of epistemology must be looked at from a new standpoint. The role of work or labor in the cognitive process is a dominant epistemological theme in Marx's thought. Marx understands human knowledge to be mediated through praxis or intentional human agency. The relations between Man and his environment are relations between the species and the objects of its need. Practical usefulness is a factor in the definition of truth: a judgement or opinion's usefulness is not merely a tool for establishing its truth, but is what creates its truth.

In his Theses on Feuerbach, Marx admonishes the materialism of Ludwig Feuerbach for its contemplative theory of knowledge. Marx holds that Feuerbach's mistake lies with his failure to envisage objects as sensuous, practical, human activity. For Marx, perception is itself a component of Man's practical relationship to the world. The object of Man's perception is not "given" by indifferent nature, but is a humanized object, conditioned by human needs and efforts.

Criticism
As the terminology of alienation does not appear in a prominent manner in Marx's later works, Marxist humanism has been quite controversial within Marxist circles. The tendency was attacked by the Italian Western Marxist Galvano Della Volpe and by Louis Althusser, the French Structuralist Marxist. Althusser criticizes Marxist humanists for not recognizing what he considers to be the fundamental dichotomy between the theory of the "Young Marx" and that of the "Mature Marx". Althusser holds that Marx's thought is marked by a radical epistemological break, to have occurred in 1845 – The German Ideology being the earliest work to betray the discontinuity. For Althusser, the humanism of Marx's early writings – an ethical theory – is fundamentally incongruous with the "scientific" theory he argues is to be found in Marx's later works. In his view, the Mature Marx presents the social relations of capitalism as relations within and between structures; individuals or classes have no role as the subjects of history.

Althusser believes socialist humanism to be an ethical and thus ideological phenomenon. Humanism is a bourgeois individualist philosophy that ascribes a universal essence of Man that is the attribute of each individual and through which there is potential for authenticity and common human purpose. This essence does not exist: it is a formal structure of thought whose content is determined by the dominant interests of each historical epoch. The argument of socialist humanism rests on a similar moral and ethical basis. Hence, it reflects the reality of discrimination and exploitation that gives rise to it but never truly grasps this reality in thought. Marxist theory must go beyond this to a scientific analysis that directs to underlying forces such as economic relations and social institutions. Philosopher Kate Soper states that Althusser for this reason sympathized with the criticisms of socialist humanism made by the Chinese Communist Party, which condemned the tendency as "revisionism" and "phony communism".

Althusser sees Marxist theory as primarily science and not philosophy but he does not adhere to Engels's "natural philosophy". He claims that the philosophy implicit in Marxism is an epistemology (theory  of knowledge) that sees science as "theoretical practice" and philosophy as the "theory of theoretical practice". However, he later qualifies this by claiming that Marxist philosophy, unlike Marxist science, has normative and ideological elements: Marxist philosophy is "politics in the field of theory" and "class struggle in theory".

Humanist defences
Althusser is critical of what he perceives to be a reliance among Marxist humanists on Marx's 1844 Manuscripts, which Marx did not write for publication. Marxist humanists strongly dispute this: they hold that the concept of alienation is recognizable in Marx's mature work even when the terminology has been abandoned. Teodor Shanin and Raya Dunayevskaya assert that not only is alienation present in the late Marx, but that there is no meaningful distinction to be made between the "young Marx" and "mature Marx". The Marxist humanist activist Lilia D. Monzó states that "Marxist-Humanism, as developed by Raya Dunayevskaya, considers the totality of Marx's works, recognizing that his early work in the Economic and Philosophic Manuscripts of 1844, was profoundly humanist and led to and embeds his later works, including Capital."

Contra Althusser, Leszek Kołakowski argues that although it is true that in Capital Marx treats human individuals as mere embodiments of functions within a system of relations apparently possessed of its own dynamic and created independently, he does so not as a general methodical rule, but as a critique of the dehumanizing nature of exchange-value. When Marx and Engels present individuals as non-subjects subordinated to structures that they unwittingly support, their intention is to illuminate the absence of control that persons have in bourgeois society. Marx and Engels do not see the domination of alien forces over humans as an eternal truth, but rather as the very state of affairs to be ended by the overthrow of capitalism.

Marxist humanists
Notable thinkers associated with Marxist humanism include:

 Kevin B. Anderson (born 1948), American social theorist and activist.
 Walter Benjamin (1892–1940), German-Jewish Marxist literary critic, essayist, translator, and philosopher.
 John Berger (1926–2017), English art critic, novelist, painter and author.
 Marshall Berman (1940–2013), American Marxist Humanist writer and philosopher. Author of All That Is Solid Melts into Air.
 Ernst Bloch (1885–1977), German Marxist philosopher.
 Raya Dunayevskaya (1910–1987), founder of the philosophy of Marxist Humanism in the United States.
 Frantz Fanon (1925–1961), psychiatrist, philosopher, revolutionary, and author from Martinique.
 Frankfurt School (1930s onwards), a school of neo-Marxist critical theory, social research, and philosophy.
 Paulo Freire (1921–1997), Brazilian educator and influential theorist of critical pedagogy.
 Erich Fromm (1900–1980), internationally renowned social psychologist, psychoanalyst, and humanistic philosopher.
 Nigel Gibson British & American philosopher
 Lucien Goldmann (1913–1970), French philosopher and sociologist of Jewish-Romanian origin.
 Lewis Gordon (born 1962), Black American philosopher.
 André Gorz (1923–2007), Austrian and French social philosopher.
 Antonio Gramsci (1891–1937), an Italian writer, politician, political philosopher, and linguist. 
 Christopher Hill (1912–2003), English Marxist historian.
 C. L. R. James (1901–1989), Afro-Trinidadian historian, journalist, socialist theorist and writer.
 Andrew Kliman, Marxist economist and philosopher.
 Leszek Kołakowski (1927–2009), Polish philosopher and historian of ideas. Kołakowski broke with Stalinism  after the Polish 1968 political crisis forced him out of Poland.
 Karel Kosík (1926–2003), Czech philosopher who wrote on topics such as phenomenology and dialectics from a Marxist humanist perspective.
 Henri Lefebvre (1901–1991), French sociologist, intellectual and philosopher generally considered to be a Neo-Marxist. 
 John Lewis (philosopher) (1889–1976), British Unitarian minister and Marxist philosopher.
 György Lukács (1885–1971), Hungarian Marxist philosopher and literary critic. 
 Herbert Marcuse (1898–1979), German philosopher and sociologist, and a member of the Frankfurt School.
 José Carlos Mariátegui (1894–1930), Peruvian intellectual, journalist and political philosopher.
 Peter McLaren (born 1948), one of the leading architects of critical pedagogy.
 David McReynolds (1929–2018), American democratic socialist and pacifist activist.
 Rodolfo Mondolfo (1877–1976), Italian Marxist philosopher and historian of Ancient Greek philosophy.
 News and Letters Committees (1950s onwards), a small, revolutionary-socialist organization in the United States founded by Dunayevskaya.
 Praxis School (1960s and 1970s), Marxist humanist philosophical movement. It originated in Zagreb and Belgrade in the SFR Yugoslavia.
 Budapest School, of Marxist humanism, post-Marxism and dissident liberalism that emerged in Hungary in the early 1960s. 
 Maximilien Rubel (1905–1996)
 Franklin Rosemont (1943–2009), American writer, artist, historian, and activist.
 Wang Ruoshui (1926–2002), Chinese journalist and philosopher.
 Jean-Paul Sartre (1905–1980), French existentialist philosopher, playwright, novelist, screenwriter, political activist, biographer, and literary critic.
 Cyril Smith (1929–2008), British lecturer of statistics at the London School of Economics, socialist, and revolutionary humanist.
 Ivan Sviták (1925–1994), Czech social critic and aesthetic theorist.
 E. P. Thompson (1924–1993), English historian, socialist and peace campaigner.
 Raymond Williams (1921–1988), Welsh literary theorist, co-founder of cultural studies.

See also

 Autonomist Marxism 
 Budapest School
 Dialectic
 Frankfurt School
 Historical materialism
 Karl Marx
 Luxemburgism
 Marxism
 New Left
 Orthodox Marxism
 Praxis School
 Secular humanism
 Structure and agency
 Subjectivity

References

Footnotes

Bibliography

Further reading

External links
 C L R James Archive
 The Hobgoblin, a Journal of Marxist-Humanism
 Libertarian Communist Library Marxist Humanism holdings
 Marxist Humanism, subject index at marxists.org
 Marxist-Humanist Dialectics
  Marxist-Humanist Initiative
 News & Letters, the Newspaper
 Raya Dunayevskaya Archive
 International Marxist-Humanist Organization official website
 21st-century Marx

Humanism
Marxist schools of thought